The Maringa river is a river in the Democratic Republic of the Congo. The Maringa, and the Lopori River to the north, join near Basankusu to form the Lulonga River, a tributary of the Congo River.
The Maringa / Lopori basin contains the Maringa-Lopori-Wamba Landscape, an area of great ecological importance.
The Ngando people live in the Maringa River area north of Ikela.

References

Rivers of the Democratic Republic of the Congo
Congo drainage basin